Florence Ellen Arnold (born 28 December 1988), better known as Florrie, is an English pop singer-songwriter, drummer and model. Closely associated with the Xenomania production house, since joining as their in-house drummer in 2008 she has played live and on record for popular artists such as Kylie Minogue, Girls Aloud and the Pet Shop Boys.

In 2010, she began a solo career. She has drawn positive reaction from the online music community for releasing her own material in collaboration with remixers such as Fred Falke for download without charge. In 2010, Florrie released a four-track EP titled Introduction, followed by the six-track EP Experiments in 2011, and by the four-track EP Late in 2012. In 2013, Florrie released a single, "Live a Little", that was used in promotion for Sony's XBA-C10 in-ear headphones campaign. In 2014, she announced that she had signed to a major label, Sony Music, and released an EP, Sirens. Florrie has yet to release her debut album.

Biography

Early life and career
Florrie was born Florence Arnold on 28 December 1988 in Bristol, where she attended Colston's Girls' School. She became interested in playing the drums when she was in Greece on a family holiday at age six. As a teenager she started her own band called Fi Fi Saloon, which performed Avril Lavigne covers and original songs she described as "really trash, punky girl rock-pop". She moved to London when she was 17 years old and gigged with several bands including Selfservice, who signed a development deal with songwriter Guy Chambers. Florrie performed with Selfservice at night and worked part-time as a nanny during the day.

A meeting with the manager of Australian singer Gabriella Cilmi led Florrie to a successful audition as the drummer in the houseband of Xenomania, the successful Kent-based production team. Her first job was playing on Girls Aloud's 2008 single "The Promise", although she also assisted with administration work. She provided drums and drum programming on Xenomania-produced tracks by Alesha Dixon, Rebecca Ferguson, Kylie Minogue, Pet Shop Boys, and The Saturdays. She also co-wrote the 2010 single "One Touch" for the short-lived female duo Mini Viva, "Something New" (2012) for Girls Aloud, and "What Are You Waiting For?" (2014) for The Saturdays. Xenomania producer Brian Higgins encouraged Florrie to sing one of the songs she had written, which prompted her to pursue her own music career.

Independent releases

Florrie's debut release, a Fred Falke remix of "Call 911", reportedly had over 1,000 downloads around the world within a few days of its February 2010 release. In mid-2010, Florrie was announced as the face of the then-new Nina Ricci fragrance Nina L'Elixir. She starred in the TV advert for the campaign performing a cover of Blondie's "Sunday Girl", and also featured in print advertisements shot by Ruven Afanador. In July 2010, Florrie featured on The Guardians "New Band of the Day" column. Besides these two tracks, three more were released as remix-only versions: "Panic Attack" (April 2010), "Fascinate Me" and "Come Back to Mine" (May 2010).

Florrie released her debut EP, Introduction, in November 2010 through the iTunes Store. The EP was made available for free download on her official website, as well as on 12" vinyl pressings limited to 500 copies. Music blogs Popjustice, ArjanWrites.com, electronic rumors, Dödselectro and Sundtrak praised the quality of the music, while noting the free availability of the tracks and expressing interest for future material. Others identified how the awareness of Florrie's music has been assisted by online social networks and a grassroots strategy. Florrie told Ponystep magazine:

Florrie's second EP, Experiments, was released in June 2011 to a five-star review from About.com. The lead single, "Begging Me" was released in April 2011. The music video for the second single, "I Took a Little Something", was a collaboration with fashion house Dolce & Gabbana. A third EP, Late, was released in May 2012 on iTunes, accompanied by the single "Shot You Down". MuuMuse wrote of the EP, "Every inch of the record is one carefully crafted hook after another; each pulsating beat more danceable and jaw-dropping than the next".

Sony Music
Florrie announced on her website in mid-2012 that she would sign to a major record label, thus making Late her final release as an independent artist; this label was later reported as being Sony Music. In February 2013, Florrie was announced as the face of denim label Vigoss for its spring 2013 campaign. Florrie appears in the commercial for Sony's XBA-C10 in-ear headphones, which debuted in April 2013 and features the track "Live a Little".

Florrie released her fourth EP, Sirens, in April 2014, with music videos accompanying three of the tracks. A single, "Little White Lies", followed in August 2014. The music video for Florrie's 2015 single "Too Young to Remember" was premiered online via fashion retailer H&M, who selected the singer to front their worldwide H&M Loves Music campaign. Her debut album was originally announced for 2015 and was planned for release in late 2016, following a series of festival appearances and other live dates. Florrie has been recording with songwriters and producers including Joel Little, Tim Anderson, MoZella, Jesse Shatkin, and Twin, the latter of whom produced and co-wrote Florrie's single "Real Love" (released in early 2016). Unfortunately, due to Sony and Florrie's creative visions clashing, the two had parted ways as it was said that Sony enticed her to drift away from making music from Xenomania and work with others. This also meant that the album was scrapped.

In 2019, she made a musical comeback with the single "Borderline", where she was currently signed to Xenomania's newly-established self-titled label. She was also announced as a member of the group Capulets, with whom she plays and writes for. She also released another single later on in the year, entitled "Unstable", where she could be gearing up to release a new project.

In May 2020, she released new the song "Hell or High Water", which in the latter weeks of the month, helped to promote Xenomania's newest signees Clara McHugh and Paige Cavell who also released new music.

On 6 April 2020, Florrie released the song "Butterflies".

Musical style
In an interview with Ponystep, Florrie described her style as "a big mixture: Kind of a sixties, organic feel merged with modern pop beats and electronics". She also told Metro, "I grew up listening to my dad's Beatles records but I love electronic music, I like doing upbeat stuff to make people dance." The Guardian writer Paul Lester said about Florrie that "she completely bypasses the sweaty authenticity of groaning determination for a slicker, brighter sort of pop desire. This comes across in her music. It's breezy". Time magazine wrote in 2014 that "Her brand of pop music is playful, propulsive, and built around rhythm, bearing the influence of her work as a session drummer for the songwriting/production squad Xenomania".

Personal life
After the release of her fourth EP, Sirens, Florrie met and began dating George Ezra with whom she was romantically involved with for three years, until it was reported that they split up in early 2020.

Discography

Extended plays
 Introduction (2010)
 Experiments (2011)
 Late (2012)
 Sirens (2014)

References

External links

 
 
 

1988 births
Living people
English dance musicians
English drummers
English electronic musicians
English women guitarists
English guitarists
English female models
English women singer-songwriters
British women drummers
Models from Bristol
Musicians from Bristol
Synth-pop singers
English women in electronic music
English women pop singers
21st-century British guitarists
21st-century drummers
21st-century English women singers
21st-century English singers
21st-century women guitarists